Dakota J. Collins (born August 15, 1991 in Santa Barbara, California) is an American soccer player who plays for Orange County FC in the National Premier Soccer League.

Career
Collins played four years of college soccer, two years with UCLA Bruins and a further two with the Cal Poly Mustangs.  During his time in college, he also spent the 2009 season with Orange County Blue Star and the 2012 season with Des Moines Menace in the USL PDL.

After graduating, Collins spent 2013 with USL PDL club FC Tucson, where he scored 3 goals in 13 appearances.

Collins signed his first professional contract in March 2014, joining USL Pro club Sacramento Republic.

At the beginning of 2015, he moved to Croatia, joining third-tier NK HAŠK from Zagreb.

References

1991 births
Living people
American soccer players
UCLA Bruins men's soccer players
Cal Poly Mustangs men's soccer players
Orange County Blue Star players
Des Moines Menace players
FC Tucson players
Sacramento Republic FC players
NK HAŠK players
Association football forwards
Soccer players from California
USL League Two players
American expatriate soccer players
American expatriate sportspeople in Croatia
National Premier Soccer League players